Christine A. Muschik is an assistant professor in the Department of Physics and Astronomy at the University of Waterloo as well as a part of the Institute for Quantum Computing.. She completed her PhD in 2011 at the Max-Planck-Institute for Quantum Optics. She completed postdoctoral fellowships at the Institute for Quantum Optics and Quantum Information in Innsbruck and the Institute of Photonic Sciences in Castelldefels. As of 2020, she has over 2000 citations on over 50 publications. She has also been featured in several articles in Nature magazine, MIT Technology Review, and Physics World.

Awards and honours

 2020-2022 Azrieli Global Scholar by CIFAR
 2019 Alfred P. Sloan Research Fellow of Physics 
 2018 Emmy Noether Fellowship to launch her investigation into quantum simulations of Lattice Gauge Theories

Selected bibliography
Below is a list of the most commonly cited articles co-authored by Muschik, ordered by date of publication.
 According to Google Scholar, this article has been cited 142  times  
 According to Google Scholar, it has been cited 511 times.
 According to Google Scholar, this article has been cited 102  times

References

External links

Canadian women physicists
Living people
Quantum information scientists
Academic staff of the University of Waterloo
Year of birth missing (living people)